Alfred Richard Gurrey Sr.  (1852–1944) was an English-born landscape painter who moved to the United States at age 20.  In 1900, his employer, Fireman's Fund Insurance Company, transferred him from San Francisco to Hawaii.  In Hawaii, he worked as an insurance adjuster and was secretary of the Board of Fire Underwriters of the Territory of Hawaii.  Although without formal art training, he painted Hawaiian landscapes and opened an art and antiques store in Honolulu. Gurrey was a member of the Kilohana Art League.  In 1916, he retired from the Board of Fire Underwriters and moved to Kauai, where he continued to paint.  His son, Alfred Richard Gurrey Jr. (1874–1928) and daughter-in-law, Caroline Haskins Gurrey (1875–1927), were photographers active in Hawaii.

In 1996, Alfred Gurrey’s daughter Florence and her husband Carl Bayer donated 30 of Alfred R. Gurrey Sr.’s paintings to the Kauai Museum in Lihue, Hawaii.  His painting Moonlight on Ocean (Kauai), c. 1918, is in the collection of the Hawaii State Art Museum

References
 Forbes, David W., He Makana, The Gertrude Mary Joan Damon Haig Collection of Hawaiian Art, Paintings and Prints, Hawaii State Foundation of Culture and the Arts, 2013, pp. 26–31
 Severson, Don R. Finding Paradise: Island Art in Private Collections, University of Hawaii Press, 2002, p. 111, 203.

Footnotes

External links

 Alfred Richard Gurrey Sr. in AskArt.com
 History of the Bayer Estate

1852 births
1944 deaths
Artists from Hawaii
19th-century American painters
American male painters
20th-century American painters
19th-century American male artists
20th-century American male artists